The U.S.–South Korea Status of Forces Agreement (Hanja: , SOFA), formally Agreement under Article IV of the Mutual Defence Treaty between the Republic of Korea and the United States, Regarding Facilities and Areas and the Status of United States Armed Forces in the Republic of Korea, is an agreement between South Korea and the U.S. approved and enacted in 1967 and revised in 1991 and 2001. It is a status of forces agreement that concerns the treatment of United States Forces in South Korea. Lt. General Jan-Marc Jouas is the U.S. representative to the joint committee on the Status of Forces Agreement. 

The U.S.-South Korea Status of Forces Agreement is often a focal point for political disputes regarding US presence in South Korea. The agreement's promotion of U.S military presence in South Korea has served as a catalyst for many base expansion protests such as the Daechuri Protests which was a 2005/6 protest against the expansion of U.S. military base Camp Humphreys.

See also 
 United States Forces Korea
 Status of forces agreement
 Mutual Defense Treaty (United States–South Korea)

External links 

 Current USFK SOFA Documentation – United States Forces Korea Public Portal

South Korea–United States relations
United States military in South Korea
Military alliances involving the United States